Fired Up is the debut solo album by English singer Alesha Dixon. Her first solo project, conceived after the disbandment of her former band, girl group Mis-Teeq, Dixon worked with a variety of producers on the album, including Peer Åström, Anders Bagge, Johnny Douglas, Paul Epworth, Brian Higgins, Richard Stannard, and Xenomania. Initially scheduled for a 6 November 2006 release through Polydor and Victor Entertainment in the United Kingdom, it was postponed indefinitely after Dixon was dropped by Polydor several days before its release.

The album was preceded by two singles, including lead single "Lipstick," a top twenty hit on the UK Singles Chart, and follow-up "Knockdown". Fired Up eventually received a physical release in Japan and Taiwan in 2008, where it was issued along with new artwork, a re-worked listing order, and additional tracks, including two remixes and the previously unreleased song "Voodoo." Dixon later exclusively sold Fired Up in the UK as merchandise on her tour, The Alesha Show, supporting the album of the same name.

Background
Dixon launched her solo career after Mis-Teeq's break-up in 2005 and signed a £500,000, three-album deal with Polydor Records. She spent a year writing and recording her solo debut album, working with a wide range of producers including Richard X, Xenomania, Johnny Douglas, Brian Higgins, Estelle and Paul Epworth. During this period, Dixon performed mononymously, known simply as "Alesha".

In June 2005, she announced her first solo single to be "Superficial". However, at the last minute, the song "Lipstick" was chosen as the first single. "Lipstick" was released on 14 August 2006, and charted at 14 on the UK Single Charts. Dixon released her second single "Knockdown" on 30 October 2006, which charted at 25 on the UK Download Chart. However, on the official UK Singles Charts, the single peaked at number 45, falling down to 68 the following week. On 6 November 2006, it was revealed that Dixon had been dropped by her label, Polydor Records. Polydor gave her full rights to her unreleased debut album, Fired Up.

Track listing

Notes
 signifies additional producer

Charts

Release history

References

2006 debut albums
Alesha Dixon albums
Albums produced by Xenomania
Polydor Records albums